The Stories World Tour was the second and final worldwide concert tour by Swedish DJ Avicii.

Tour dates

Notes

References

2015 concert tours